Stanley Berneche (born 1947) is a Canadian artist. He was born in Windsor, Ontario.

Berneche became known in the early 1970s, for working on the Canadian humour magazine Fuddle Duddle, published by Jeffrey R. Darcey in 1971–2. Berneche and writer Peter Evans, created the character Captain Canada and his sidekick Beaverboy for Fuddle Duddle'''s third and fourth issues. Berneche also drew the strip True Tales of the RCMP for the Canadian Boy Scout magazine Trailblazers''.

He was inducted into the Canadian Comic Book Creator Hall of Fame as part of the 2008 Joe Shuster Awards.

References

Canadian cartoonists
Canadian comics artists
1947 births
Living people
Artists from Windsor, Ontario